Anania flavicolor is a moth in the family Crambidae. It was described by Eugene G. Munroe and Akira Mutuura in 1968. It is found in Taiwan.

References

Moths described in 1968
Pyraustinae
Moths of Taiwan